Yarlett or Yarlet may refer to:
Claire Yarlett, British born American actress
Yarlet School, a preparatory school in Staffordshire, United Kingdom